Yui Kamiji and Jordanne Whiley defeated the defending champion Jiske Griffioen and her partner Marjolein Buis in the final, 6–2, 6–7(3–7), 6–2 to win the women's doubles wheelchair tennis title at the 2014 Australian Open. It was their first step towards an eventual Grand Slam.

Griffioen and Aniek van Koot were the reigning champions, but van Koot did not participate due to injury.

Seeds
  Yui Kamiji /  Jordanne Whiley (champions)
  Marjolein Buis /  Jiske Griffioen (final)

Draw

Finals

References
Draw

Wheelchair Women's Doubles
2014 Women's Doubles